 (1945-2013) was a Japanese photographer who is particularly known for his photography of Bali.

Suga was born in Hakata, Fukuoka Prefecture, in 1945. He graduated in photography from Nihon University.

He won the Domon Ken Award in 1987 for photographs of Bali and the Higashikawa Domestic Photographers Award in 1998 for photographs of Burma. He has been a professor at Nihon University.

Publications

Books by Suga
Makai, tenkai, fujigikai, Bari. Tokyo: Kodansha, 1983. . Photographs of Bali.
Bari miwaku: Suga Hiroshi sakuhinshū. Tokyo: Genkō-sha. . Text by Morio Kitahara. Photographs of Bali.
Ajia mugen-kō: Suga Hiroshi sakuhinshū / Strides Across Images of Asia. Photo Salon. Tokyo: Genkō-sha, 1987. .
Dai-Nikkō: Suga Hiroshi shashinshū. Tokyo: Kodansha, 1991. . Photographs of Nikkō.
Hakata Gion Yamagasa. Fukuoka: Kaichōsha, 1995. .
Etsunan saisai. Ajia Minzoku Shashin Sōsho 17. Tokyo: Hirakawa Shuppansha, 1996. . Photographs of Vietnam.
Myanmā ōgon: Suga Hiroshi shashin. Tokyo: Tōhō-shuppan, 1997. . Photographs of Burma.
Unnan no suito Reikō: Suga Hiroshi shashinshū. Tokyo: Tōhō-shuppan, 2000. . Photographs of Lijiang, Yunnan.
Bari-tō dai-hyakka. Tokyo: TBS Britannica, 2001. . Photographs of Bali.
Mekon 4525km. Tokyo: Jitsugyō-no-Nihon-sha, 2002. . Photographs along the Mekong.
Kyō no katadomari. Tokyo: Futabasha, 2004. . Photographs of Kyoto.
Suga Hiroshi ... Amami: Shima ni ikite. Tokyo: Shinchosha, 2007. . Photographs of Amami Ōshima.

Other books with contributions by Suga
Hakata Gion Yamagasa. Tokyo: Kodansha, 1983. . Text by Hōsei Hasegawa. Photographs of Fukuoka.
Matsuri to geinō no shima Bali. Music Gallery 3. Tokyo: Ongaku-no-tomo-sha, 1984. . Text by Fumiko Tamura and Teigo Yoshida. Photographs of Bali.
Bari: Chō-mugen-kai. Tokyo: Ōbunsha, 1987. . Translation of Bali Entranced, with essays by Lyall Watson. Photographs of Bali.
Ajia gensō: Mōmu o tabi suru. Tokyo: Kodansha, 1989. . Text by Tomomi Muramatsu. Travels across Asia following William Somerset Maugham.
Shanhai suigan. Tokyo: Kodansha. . Text by Tomomi Muramatsu. Photographs of Shanghai.
Chiisa na tomodachi: Shakashū. Tokyo: Kodansha, 1996. . With tanka by Machi Tawara.
Madamu ajian no yasashii gohan. Tokyo: Kōsaidō Shuppan, 2001. . Text by Keiko Moriwaki.
Kusa o hamu: Kyōto "Nakahigashi" no shiki. Tokyo: President-sha, 2002. . Text by Hisashi Kashiwai. On Japanese food in Kyoto.
Uchidate Machiko no gyōten Chūgoku. Tokyo: JTB, 2003. . Text by Machiko Uchidate.
Kore tabe!. Tokyo: Shinchosha, 2003. . About restaurants in Tokyo. Text by Masahiko Katsuya.
Masahiro no Tōkyō zubari hyakken. Tokyo: Jitsugyō-no-Nihon-sha, 2007. . About restaurants in Tokyo. Text by Masahiro Yamamoto.
Kizzu fotogurafāzu no mōgakkō no 23-nin ga totta!. Tokyo: Shinchosha, 2008. . Photographs by blind schoolchildren, edited by Suga.
Sushi: Sukiyabashi Jirō: Bi, shoku, waza. Tokyo: Graphic-sha, 2009. . Also titled Sushi. Text by the sushi chef Jirō Ono, edited by Masahiro Yamamoto.
Dāisuki na mono pachiri! Fotoarubamu-ehon. Tokyo: Nihon Hyōjun, 2009. . Photographs by blind schoolchildren, edited by Suga.
Kikoerukai mori no koe: Afan no mori suga hiroshi shashinshū. Tokyo: Studio Debo, 2009. . Text by C. W. Nicol.

Notes

Japanese photographers
People from Fukuoka
1945 births
Photography in Myanmar
Photography in China
Photography in Indonesia
Photography in Vietnam
Nihon University alumni
Academic staff of Nihon University
Photography academics
2013 deaths